Michael Stanco  (August 2, 1968 – August 21, 2014) was an American professional wrestler, better known by his ring name Maximum Capacity, and is billed in many independent promotions as the "World's Largest Athlete".

Wrestling career
Born in Newark, New Jersey, Stanco trained at the School Of Hard Knocks under former WWF preliminary wrestler Rusty Brooks. Billy Fives also played a large role in training Max. He taught him many of grappling and submission moves that Fives was famous for in Japan. Max used to work as a bodyguard and bouncer at many of South Florida's finest nightclubs. Capacity gave up this line of work when he was involved in a very dangerous bar incident and took up wrestling.

Capacity began working for the now defunct Future of Wrestling in January 2001. He quickly became their number one heel. During his time in FOW, Max faced the likes of Jerry "The King" Lawler, Barry Horowitz and Hacksaw Jim Duggan. Max was defeated for the FOW Hardcore Title by Horowitz in 2002.

Max worked against Chris Raaber for the EWA World Heavyweight Championship in Leoben, Austria in November 2003.

After taking 2½ years off due to injuries, Capacity returned to the ring for Pro Wrestling ZERO1-MAX in Japan in October 2006.
He did a 10 match tour throughout Japan. During this tour he faced the likes of Masato Tanaka, Shinjiro Otani and Takao Omori.

After his return to the United States, Max began working for D1PW in Davie, FL. D1PW has thus since begun an invasion angle with a North Carolina based company called WCEW. Maximum Capacity defeated Tommy Vandal on July 21, 2007 for their Extreme Title.

Max just completed another overseas tour. Wrestling in Tuggen, Switzerland on May 23, 2009 vs Jamie Gardner for the WWPW Heavyweight title.

Max was diagnosed with Colorectal Cancer on December 29, 2011 and was forced to retire against his wishes.  He worked his final retirement match for Frank Goodman's PWX promotion at PWX-A Wrestling Odyssey in Orlando, FL on January 28, 2012.  Although he fought hard to battle his illness and make one final return to the ring, his cancer continued to worsen, making any return impossible.

TV and movie career
Maximum Capacity did a very successful episode of The Jerry Springer Show in 2001 called "3 Pigs and A Trailer". This has since gone on to become a Springer classic. Max has also appeared on numerous TV wrestling shows throughout Europe, Asia and America. Max has also appeared on Germany's largest TV station RTL, when they did a featured story on him in 2003 when he wrestled in Austria.

Max made his feature film debut in 2009's Death Print.

Max was involved in the Celebrity Boxing 25 show at the Hard Rock Casino Passions nightclub where Jose Canseco sent his brother Ozzie instead. Max wrestled the opening match vs. Jordan Rayner on March 26, 2011.

Death

After a nearly 3 year battle with colorectal cancer, Max was admitted to the hospital on August 19, 2014 and succumbed to his illness on August 21, 2014 in Sunrise, Florida.

Championships and accomplishments
Future of Wrestling
FOW Hardcore Championship (1 time)
World Class Extreme Wrestling
WCEW Extreme Championship (1 time)

See also
 List of premature professional wrestling deaths

References

External links
Radio Interview with Maximum Capacity
Interview with Maximum Capacity
CageMatch.de - Maximum Capacity 

American male professional wrestlers
2014 deaths
1968 births